Butler Elementary School may refer to:

Butler Elementary School (Springfield, Illinois), Springfield, Illinois
Butler Elementary School, Fort Dodge, Iowa
Butler Elementary School, a school in the Arlington Independent School District in Arlington, Texas